The Maltese Futsal League,, known as the Gatorade League for sponsorship reasons, is the official futsal league in Malta. It was founded in 2011 and is currently sponsored by Gatorade. The Maltese futsal championship currently consists of 14 teams. It is organised by the Futsal Malta Association and the Malta Football Association. Prior to a decrease in teams, the league used to be known as the Maltese Futsal Premier Division, which was the highest tier, with a promotion and relegation system tied to the Maltese Futsal First Division.

The league is played entirely in the Corradino Sports Pavilion.

History 

Futsal has been officially played since 1998. The league started in 1999 when three University students, who had organized the unofficial Dr. Stanley's Workshop five-a-side league, contacted the Malta FA. Laboratoires Alta Care were the first well-documented league winner of any Maltese futsal championship. The club won two titles in a row, for the season 2000-01 and 2001-02.

The league was created in 2011. The highest peak saw 4 divisions with over 70 teams. Teams started decreasing when the Futsal Malta Association made requirements more stringent to make the league more professional.

Eventually, with a further decrease in teams, only one division was necessary, which became known as the Maltese Futsal League, as of the 2015–2016 season.

Champions

Key

Performance by club

2016–2017 season 

In the 2016–17 season, the FMA reopened to independent teams not part of a football club from within the Maltese football league system.

Format 
There are 14 teams which shall play each other once. After this round, the teams split into the top 6 teams, known as the Elite pool, and the remainder play in the Division One pool. The Elite teams play each other once again and the first 4 after this round, enter a knockout playoff stage. The winner of the playoff stage enters the UEFA Futsal League cup.

Teams 
Ħamrun Tre Angeli
Marsascala Futsal
Mrieħel ESS
Pieta SS Nordiska
Qormi Futsal
Luxol Futsal
Swieqi Utd Futsal
Swieqi Utd Under 21 Futsal
Tarxien JMI
University of Malta Students' Futsal Team
Junior College
Valletta Futsal

References

External links 
Futsal Malta Association
Malta Football Association

Futsal in Malta
futsal
Malta
2011 establishments in Malta
Sports leagues established in 2011